The 1999 HEW Cyclassics was the fourth edition of the HEW Cyclassics cycle race and was held on 15 August 1999. The race started and finished in Hamburg. The race was won by Mirko Celestino.

General classification

References

1999
1999 in German sport
Hew Cyclassics
1999 in road cycling
August 1999 sports events in Europe